Royal Bed Bouncer is the third album by Dutch progressive rock band Kayak, released in 1975. Their progressive approach from the first two albums was mixed with a more basic pop/rock sound. Nine of the ten songs were written by Ton Scherpenzeel, with Pim Koopman only contributing the instrumental "Patricia Anglaia". The album was produced by Gerrit-Jan Leenders and Kayak.

The original LP was released by EMI in the Netherlands (although copies on the Phonogram/Vertigo label also exist). In the USA, the LP was issued by Janus Records, with different sleeve design. The 1995 CD release was done by independent label Pseudonym.

"Chance For A Lifetime" was the only single release from this album, reaching the Dutch top-20. In 1997, the line-up of this album reunited for a Dutch TV-special called "Classic Albums". This — along with a few live appearances — eventually lead to Kayak reforming in 1999.

Track listing
 Royal Bed Bouncer (4:02)
 Life Of Gold (3:25)
 You're So Bizarre (3:48)
 Bury The World (4:21)
 Chance For A Lifetime (4:15)
 If This Is Your Welcome (4:56)
 Moments Of Joy (4:00)
 Patricia Anglaia (2:14)
 Said No Word (5:15)
 My Heart Never Changed (2:33)

All songs composed by Ton Scherpenzeel, except "Patricia Anglaia" (Pim Koopman)

Bonus tracks on 1995 CD release:

 Alibi (3:40) (from Kayak's 2nd album)
 Mountain Too Rough (3:57) (from Kayak's 2nd album)
 Woe And Alas (3:00) (from Kayak's 2nd album)
 Mouldy Wood (5:15) (from Kayak's 1st album)
 Lovely Luna (8:19) (from Kayak's 1st album)
 Forever Is A Lonely Thought (5:26) (from Kayak's 1st album)
 Still Try To Write A Book (2:01) (single b-side from 1973)
 Give It A Name (2:43) (single b-side from 1973)
 Bulldozer (2:21) (demo, edited version)

Members
Kayak
 Max Werner - lead (all but 4) and backing vocals, percussion, mellotron
 Johan Slager - guitars, backing vocals
 Ton Scherpenzeel - keyboards, backing vocals, double bass
 Bert Veldkamp - bass guitar, backing vocals
 Pim Koopman - drums, backing and lead (4) vocals
Additional Personnel
Patricia Paay - wordless vocals (8)

References

1975 albums
Kayak (band) albums